Bees Saal Baad is a 1962 Indian Hindi-language psychological thriller film. It was directed by Biren Nag and produced by Hemant Kumar, who also composed the music and sang some of the songs. The film marks the directorial debut of Biren Nag, and stars Biswajeet, Waheeda Rehman, Madan Puri, Sajjan and Asit Sen.

The film is a loose adaptation of the Bengali hit thriller Jighansa (1951), which was based on Sir Arthur Conan Doyle's The Hound of the Baskervilles as well as loosely based on Hemendra Kumar Roy's novel Nishithini Bivishika.  The film topped the box office chart in 1962, becoming a "super hit." The film became very popular for the song "Kahin Deep Jale", sung by Lata Mangeshkar and written by Shakeel Badayuni for which they won Filmfare Award for Best Female Playback Singer and Filmfare Award for Best Lyricist respectively.

Plot
After a lustful Thakur in the village of Chandanghat rapes a young girl, she kills herself. Thereafter, the Thakur is killed by what the local people call the girl's vengeful spirit. Then the Thakur's son is also reportedly killed by the same spirit. Twenty years after the Thakur's death, his grandson Kumar comes to the village and is warned by the locals that the spirit will kill him as well, but he does not believe them. He hears the singing voice of the supposed spirit the first night from the swamp. The next day as he wakes up, he finds out about Radha, a carefree girl, who is the niece of an old man, Ramlal.

The singing continues the second night, but Kumar is unable to find the identity of the girl singing the song. He notices that there is a source of light in his house on the terrace. The next day, Kumar finds that his coat is lost. The news reaches Radha that Kumar has been killed. Radha does not believe this and runs into the forest, where Kumar comes in front of her. He says it was not he that was killed, but another man wearing his suit. He was killed in the swamp under the same tree where his father and grandfather were killed.

Later that night, Kumar sees Laxman, his servant arguing with a girl. Laxman explains that the one who was under the tree was his sister's husband. He showed him light everyday from the terrace, and Laxman has stolen the coat and given it to him. Radha advises him to leave, since a person wearing his coat was killed by the spirit. Kumar doesn't.

Ramlal forbids Radha to meet Kumar, as people say she would be killed too. Kumar, meanwhile tries to figure out who is doing all this. Seeing Radha so sad, Ramlal tells her to call Kumar near the swamp where they will talk. Kumar goes to the swamp, and the spirit tries to kill him, but he escapes. Radha finds out that the one who was pretending to be the spirit of the girl was none other than her uncle Ramlal. It was Ramlal's daughter who had been raped by Thakur, so he killed Thakur, his son and was trying to kill his grandson now. Police arrive and persuade Ramlal to surrender himself. Kumar and Radha meet each other and have a happy ending.

Cast
 Biswajeet as Kumar Vijay Singh
 Waheeda Rehman as Radha
 Manmohan Krishna as Ramlal / Radheshyam
 Madan Puri as Dr. Pandey
 Asit Sen as Gopichand Jasoos
 Sajjan as Detective Mohan Tripathi
 Lata Sinha
 Dev Kishan as Laxman

Soundtrack
The music was composed by Hemant Kumar. 
 "Bekarar Karke Hume" - Hemant Kumar
 "Kahin Deep Jale Kahin" - Lata Mangeshkar
 "Sapne Suhane" - Lata Mangeshkar
 "Yeh Mohabbat Mein" - Lata Mangeshkar
 "Zara Nazaron Se Kah Do Ji" - Hemant Kumar

Awards and nominations
Filmfare Awards
 Best Lyricist - Shakeel Badayuni for the song "Kahin Deep Jale Kahin Dil"
 Best Female Playback Singer - Lata Mangeshkar for the song "Kahin Deep Jale Kahin Dil"
 Best Editing - Keshav Nanda
 Best Sound Design - S. Y. Pathak
Nominations
 Best Film
 Best Director - Biren Nag
 Best Music Director - Hemant Kumar

References

External links 
 
  Bees Saal Baad on YouTube

1962 films
1960s mystery films
1960s psychological thriller films
1960s Hindi-language films
Indian detective films
Films scored by Hemant Kumar
Indian mystery thriller films
Films set in country houses
Hindi remakes of Bengali films
1962 directorial debut films
Films based on The Hound of the Baskervilles